Abdullahi Tayo Musa (born 1 February 1996) is a Nigerian international footballer who plays for Kano Pillars, as a defender.

Career
Born in Kano, he has played club football for Ramcy Kano, Wikki Tourists and Kano Pillars.

He made his international debut for Nigeria in 2018.

References

1996 births
Living people
Nigerian footballers
Nigeria international footballers
Wikki Tourists F.C. players
Kano Pillars F.C. players
Association football defenders
Sportspeople from Kano
Nigeria A' international footballers
2018 African Nations Championship players